John Eshun (17 July 1942 – 6 November 2018) was a Ghana international football defender.

Career
Born in Sekondi, Eshun began playing club football for local sides Sekondi Eleven Wise F.C. and Sekondi Hasaacas F.C. Eshun represented Ghana at the 1968 Summer Olympics in Mexico City and the 1972 Summer Olympics in Munich. He also made several appearances for the senior Ghana national football team, including two FIFA World Cup qualifying matches, and he played at the 1968 and 1970 African Cup of Nations finals.

After Eshun retired from playing football, he became a coach. He managed Tema Youth, Ebusua Dwarfs. and Berekum Arsenal.

References

External links

John Eshun's profile at Sports Reference.com
John Eshun's obituary

1942 births
2018 deaths
Ghanaian footballers
Ghana international footballers
Olympic footballers of Ghana
Footballers at the 1968 Summer Olympics
Footballers at the 1972 Summer Olympics
1968 African Cup of Nations players
1970 African Cup of Nations players
Association football defenders
Ghana women's national football team managers
Sekondi Hasaacas F.C. managers
Sekondi Hasaacas F.C. players
Berekum Arsenal managers